Kertson Manswell (born October 28, 1976) also known as The Pride of Tobago, is a heavyweight former professional boxer from Trinidad and Tobago.

Amateur career

At the 2002 Commonwealth Games, Manswell won the silver medal, losing the gold to Canadian Jason Douglas. Manswell again won silver at the 2002 Central American and Caribbean Games, losing final to Victor Bisbal. At the 2003 Pan Am Games Manswell beat American Devin Vargas in the semifinals, but lost in the final to Cuban Odlanier Solis 3 to 15, giving him yet another silver medal. Manswell lost to Vargas in 2004 at the Olympic Qualifying Tournament and did not continue to the 2004 Summer Olympics.

Professional career

Manswell turned pro in 2004 at age 27 and beat his first 20 opponents, including Louis Monaco.

Manswell signed with boxing promoter Don King.

In 2011 Manswell lost three fights in a row; first KO'd by Bermane Stiverne, then outpointed by undefeated Mike Perez and fringe contender Cedric Boswell.

In 2012 he was outpointed by former and future world champion Ruslan Chagaev.

MMA

In 2018 Manswell at the age of 43 announced that he would begin training in Mixed Martial Arts (MMA) and would be featured in the main bout against MMA fighter and sambo champion Jeremy Rodulfo in the Ruff and Tuff MMA tournament in Couva.
Rodulfo defeated Manswell by securing a submission via a rear naked choke hold.

Professional boxing record

|-
|align="center" colspan=8|25 Wins (18 knockouts, 7 decisions), 12 Losses (7 knockout, 5 decisions)
|-
| align="center" style="border-style: none none solid solid; background: #e3e3e3"|Result
| align="center" style="border-style: none none solid solid; background: #e3e3e3"|Record
| align="center" style="border-style: none none solid solid; background: #e3e3e3"|Opponent
| align="center" style="border-style: none none solid solid; background: #e3e3e3"|Type
| align="center" style="border-style: none none solid solid; background: #e3e3e3"|Round
| align="center" style="border-style: none none solid solid; background: #e3e3e3"|Date
| align="center" style="border-style: none none solid solid; background: #e3e3e3"|Location
| align="center" style="border-style: none none solid solid; background: #e3e3e3"|Notes
|-align=center
|Win
|
|align=left| Kenneth Bishop
|UD
|8
|09/02/2019
|align=left| Woodbook Youth Facility, Port of Spain, Trinidad and Tobago
|align=left|
|-align=center
|Loss
|
|align=left| Vyacheslav Glazkov
|KO
|4 (10), 1:33
|15/08/2015
|align=left| Basket Hall, Krasnodar, Russia
|align=left|
|-align=center
|Loss
|
|align=left| Mitchell Rogers
|UD
|12
|19/06/2015
|align=left| San Fernando, Trinidad and Tobago
|align=left|
|-align=center
|Loss
|
|align=left| Bogdan Dinu
|TKO
|2 (8), 2:04
|23/09/2014
|align=left| Montreal Casino,  Montreal, Canada
|align=left|
|-align=center
|Loss
|
|align=left| Charles Martin
|TKO
|3 (10), 2:33
|23/06/2014
|align=left| BB King Blues Club & Grill, New York City, New York, U.S.
|align=left|
|-align=center
|Loss
|
|align=left| Wendell Jorkhu
|KO
|2
|1/12/2013
|align=left| Marabella, Trinidad and Tobago
|align=left|
|-align=center
|Loss
|
|align=left| Tor Hamer
|TKO
|1
|14/08/2013
|align=left| BB King Blues Club & Grill, New York City, New York, U.S.
|align=left|
|-align=center
|Loss
|
|align=left| Skip Scott
|UD
|12
|10/01/2013
|align=left| Bayou Event Center, Houston, Texas, U.S.
|align=left|
|-align=center
|Loss
|
|align=left| Deontay Wilder
|TKO
|1
|04/08/2012
|align=left| Mobile Civic Center–Expo Hall, Mobile, Alabama, U.S.
|align=left|
|-align=center
|Loss
|
|align=left| Alexander Ustinov
|TKO
|1
|03/03/2012
|align=left| ESPRIT arena, Düsseldorf, Germany
|align=left|
|-align=center
|Win
|
|align=left| Mitchell Rodgers
|UD
|12
|30/12/2011
|align=left| Woodbook Youth Centre, Port of Spain, Trinidad and Tobago
|align=left|
|-align=center
|Loss
|
|align=left| Ruslan Chagaev
|UD
|8
|28/01/2012
|align=left| Grand Elysée, Rotherbaum, Germany
|align=left|
|-
|Win
|
|align=left| Leon Gilkes
|KO
|1
|19/11/2011
|align=left| Port of Spain, Trinidad and Tobago
|align=left|
|-
|Win
|
|align=left| Curtis Murray
|KO
|1
|29/07/2011
|align=left| Port of Spain, Trinidad and Tobago
|align=left|
|-
|Loss
|
|align=left| Cedric Boswell
|UD
|10
|04/06/2011
|align=left| Hollywood, Florida, U.S.
|align=left|
|-
|Loss
|
|align=left| Mike Perez
|UD
|3
|07/05/2011
|align=left| Muswell Hill, London, England
|align=left|
|-
|Loss
|
|align=left| Bermane Stiverne
|TKO
|2
|29/01/2011
|align=left| Pontiac, Michigan, U.S.
|align=left|
|-
|Win
|
|align=left| Tomas Mrazek
|UD
|8
|19/03/2010
|align=left| Merksem, Antwerp, Belgium
|align=left|
|-
|Win
|
|align=left| Dennis McKinney
|UD
|8
|20/02/2010
|align=left| Mérida, Mexico
|align=left|
|-
|Win
|
|align=left| Jimmy Joseph
|TKO
|4
|24/07/2009
|align=left| Bacolet, Trinidad and Tobago
|align=left|
|-
|Win
|
|align=left| Cullen Rogers
|TKO
|1
|04/04/2009
|align=left| Pleasantville, Trinidad and Tobago
|align=left|
|-
|Win
|
|align=left| Earl Ladson
|SD
|8
|02/08/2008
|align=left| Ponce, Puerto Rico, U.S.
|align=left|
|-
|Win
|
|align=left| Cerrone Fox
|TKO
|1
|27/03/2008
|align=left| St Louis, Missouri, U.S.
|align=left|
|-
|Win
|
|align=left| Willie Perryman
|UD
|8
|30/11/2007
|align=left| Tampa, Florida, U.S.
|align=left|
|-
|Win
|
|align=left| Saul Farah
|TKO
|7
|26/12/2006
|align=left| Mucurapo, Trinidad and Tobago
|align=left|
|-
|Win
|
|align=left| Corey Sanders
|UD
|10
|14/10/2006
|align=left| Bacolet, Trinidad and Tobago
|align=left|
|-
|Win
|
|align=left| Louis Monaco
|TKO
|8
|15/06/2006
|align=left| Fyzabad, Trinidad and Tobago
|align=left|
|-
|Win
|
|align=left| Glen Williams
|TKO
|3
|31/03/2006
|align=left| Pointe-a-Pierre, Trinidad and Tobago
|align=left|
|-
|Win
|
|align=left| Curtis Murray
|KO
|3
|27/01/2006
|align=left| Princes Town, Trinidad and Tobago
|align=left|
|-
|Win
|
|align=left| Salim Zinnerman
|TKO
|1
|12/01/2006
|align=left| Marabella, Trinidad and Tobago
|align=left|
|-
|Win
|
|align=left| Kerron Speid
|KO
|3
|28/10/2005
|align=left| Saint James, Trinidad and Tobago
|align=left|
|-
|Win
|
|align=left| Mitchell Rogers
|KO
|1
|13/08/2005
|align=left| Saint James, Trinidad and Tobago
|align=left|
|-
|Win
|
|align=left| Mickey Richards
|TKO
|3
|16/06/2005
|align=left| Fyzabad, Trinidad and Tobago
|align=left|
|-
|Win
|
|align=left| Clyde Williams
|TKO
|1
|03/12/2004
|align=left| Bacolet, Trinidad and Tobago
|align=left|
|-
|Win
|
|align=left| Kurt Bess
|TKO
|4
|28/11/2004
|align=left| Georgetown, Guyana
|align=left|
|-
|Win
|
|align=left| Kurt Bess
|TKO
|1
|23/09/2004
|align=left| Port of Spain, Trinidad and Tobago
|align=left|
|-
|Win
|
|align=left| David McMillan
|KO
|1
|29/07/2004
|align=left| Arima, Trinidad and Tobago
|align=left|
|}

References

External links
 
Article about Don King
Article on Jeremy Rodulfo defeating Kertson Manswell

1976 births
Living people
Trinidad and Tobago male boxers
Commonwealth Games silver medallists for Trinidad and Tobago
Boxers at the 2002 Commonwealth Games
Boxers at the 2003 Pan American Games
Heavyweight boxers
People from Tobago
Pan American Games silver medalists for Trinidad and Tobago
Commonwealth Games medallists in boxing
Pan American Games medalists in boxing
Central American and Caribbean Games silver medalists for Trinidad and Tobago
Competitors at the 2002 Central American and Caribbean Games
Central American and Caribbean Games medalists in boxing
Medalists at the 2003 Pan American Games
Medallists at the 2002 Commonwealth Games